is a Japanese professional footballer who plays as a forward for Bundesliga club VfL Bochum and the Japan national team.

His younger brother Yuya is also a professional footballer currently playing for J1 League side Sanfrecce Hiroshima.

Club career

Sanfrecce Hiroshima
After attending Yokkaichi Chuo Technical High School, Asano joined Sanfrecce Hiroshima at the age of 18 in January 2013. He went on to win the J1 League in his debut season, making one appearance in the process.

Asano went on to win the Japanese Super Cup in 2014, while starting to break into the squad for the J1 League. He helped the side lift the league title for a second time in 2015, this time adding nine goals in 34 appearances. Due to his performances, Asano was named the J1 League Rookie of the Year.

Arsenal

On 3 July 2016, Asano was announced as Arsenal's second signing of the season, subject to a medical and international clearance. Manager Arsène Wenger described him as "a talented young striker and very much one for the future". However, Asano was refused a work permit to play in the Premier League.

Loan to VfB Stuttgart
On 26 August 2016, Asano was loaned out to VfB Stuttgart until the end of the season with an option for a further year. He made his debut in a 2–1 home loss to 1. FC Heidenheim two weeks later. On 9 April 2017, Asano scored a brace to give his side a 2–0 win over Karlsruher SC. He helped the team win the 2. Bundesliga and take promotion to the top flight.

On 22 June 2017, the loan deal with Stuttgart was extended for another season.

Loan to Hannover 96
On 23 May 2018, Asano was sent on season-long loan to Bundesliga side Hannover 96.

Partizan
On 1 August 2019, Asano completed his move to Serbian club Partizan. He signed a three-year contract and was given the number 11 shirt, while becoming the first Japanese player in club history.

Asano scored on his debut in an eventual 3–1 home win over Turkish club Yeni Malatyaspor in the first leg of the Europa League third qualifying round. He entered the field at the beginning of the second half instead of Filip Stevanović and scored his first goal for the club in the 67th minute. Partizan eliminated Yeni Malatyaspor and then the Norwegian Molde, thus qualifying for the Group L of the Europa League, with Manchester United, AZ Alkmaar and Astana as their opponents. Asano played in all European matches for Partizan this season and was also the scorer in the draw with AZ in Alkmaar (2–2) and in the victory over Astana (4–1) in Belgrade. Partizan finished on second place in the Serbian SuperLiga, behind Red Star, and Asano scored four goals in 23 league games. He also appeared in four games in the Serbian Cup, scoring two goals, both in the quarter-final match against Radnik Surdulica. However, Partizan did not manage to win the trophy in the Cup, as they were defeated by Vojvodina in the final game after a penalty shoot-out.

In the 2020/21 season Partizan did not qualify for the group stage of the Europa League. After eliminating the Latvian RFS and the Romanian Sfîntul Gheorghe, the club was defeated by the Belgian Charleroi in the third round. Asano appeared in all three European matches (only played one match each due to the pandemic), did not score a goal but recorded an assist to Seydouba Soumah for the only goal in the 2–1 away defeat against Charleroi after extra time. Having scored 18 goals in 33 league matches for Partizan in the ongoing championship, Asano announced on 2 May 2021 that he had rescinded his contract with the club.

VfL Bochum
On 23 June 2021, VfL Bochum 1848 announced the club have signed Asano who was on free agent.

International career

Youth
At youth level, Asano won a gold medal at the 2016 AFC U-23 Championship, scoring a brace against South Korea to give his side a 3–2 win in the final. He also represented Japan at the 2016 Summer Olympics, netting two goals in the tournament, as the team exited in the group stage.

Senior
On 7 May 2015, Asano was invited by Japan manager Vahid Halilhodžić for a two-day training camp. He was subsequently called up to the team for the upcoming 2015 EAFF East Asian Cup. Asano scored his first goal for Samurai Blue in a 7–2 win over Bulgaria at the 2016 Kirin Cup.

In March 2018, manager Vahid Halilhodžić left out Asano and Yosuke Ideguchi for friendly matches with Mali and Ukraine in preparations for the 2018 World Cup due to lack of playing time at club level, commenting, "It makes me sad that Asano and Ideguchi are not playing. They were the heroes of our qualifying game against Australia. They haven't been chosen this time, and if things continue the way they are, there is a chance that they won't be chosen for the World Cup". In May, Asano was named in Japan's preliminary squad for the World Cup, but failed to make the final cut.

In his first match in the 2022 World Cup, Asano scored a goal in the 83rd minute to give Japan an upset victory over Germany.

Career statistics

Club

International

Scores and results list Japan's goal tally first, score column indicates score after each Asano goal.

Honours
Sanfrecce Hiroshima
 J1 League: 2013, 2015
 Japanese Super Cup: 2013, 2014, 2016

VfB Stuttgart
 2. Bundesliga: 2016–17

Japan'
 AFC U-23 Championship: 2016

Individual
 J.League Rookie of the Year: 2015
 Japan Pro-Footballers Association awards: Best XI (2022)

References

External links

 
 
 
 
 
 

2. Bundesliga players
Arsenal F.C. players
Association football forwards
Bundesliga players
Expatriate footballers in Germany
Expatriate footballers in Serbia
FK Partizan players
Footballers at the 2016 Summer Olympics
Hannover 96 players
J.League U-22 Selection players
J1 League players
J3 League players
Japan international footballers
Japan youth international footballers
Japanese expatriate footballers
Japanese expatriate sportspeople in Germany
Japanese expatriate sportspeople in Serbia
Japanese footballers
Olympic footballers of Japan
Sanfrecce Hiroshima players
Serbian SuperLiga players
VfB Stuttgart II players
VfB Stuttgart players
VfL Bochum players
1994 births
Living people
People from Komono
2022 FIFA World Cup players